Dirk Rehbein (born 14 August 1967 in Langenfeld (Rheinland)) is a German former professional footballer who played as a midfielder. 

Rehbein joined FC Berlin in the 1990-91 season. He was the first player from West Germany to join the club. Rehbein became one of the top goal scores of FC Berlin in the early 1990s. Rehbein scored 16 goals for FC Berlin during the 1991-92 regular season. 

Rehbein made 29 appearances in the Bundesliga during his playing career. He finished his career with BFC Dynamo. 

His son Lukas, born in 1993, signed with BFC Dynamo in 2013.

References

External links 
 

1967 births
Living people
People from Mettmann (district)
Sportspeople from Düsseldorf (region)
German footballers
Association football midfielders
Bundesliga players
2. Bundesliga players
Bayer 04 Leverkusen players
SC Fortuna Köln players
Berliner FC Dynamo players
1. FC Union Berlin players
FC Hansa Rostock players
Tennis Borussia Berlin players
DDR-Oberliga players
Footballers from North Rhine-Westphalia